Naturescaping (or nature scaping) is a method of landscape design and landscaping that allows people and nature to coexist with landscaping. By incorporating certain native plants into one's yard, one can attract beneficial insects, birds, and other creatures, and help keep our rivers and streams healthy. 

Extensive urban growth and urban sprawl over the last century has had a significant impact on habitat that birds and other wildlife once called home. Homeowners with yards and gardens have a unique opportunity to curtail this loss of habitat by creating their own backyard wildlife garden, a wildlife sanctuary.

Origins 
Naturescaping takes some of its principles from the US Environmental Protection Agency's (EPA) "GreenScaping" or "Beneficial Landscaping" programs — which strive to reduce water, energy, and chemical usage. Naturescaping is an organic discipline of this practice, that is easily adapted to backyards.

The EPA has worked together with the Department of Homeland Security to encourage energy independence and reduce needs for hazardous materials. Water and energy use in residential landscaping accounts for x% (please cite correct figure) of the total water and energy use in the country. The EPA has found that one hour of lawn mowing contributes as much smog pollution as driving 10 cars for one hour (about 650 miles). 

Since the 1995 Oklahoma City federal building bombing with explosives made from fertilizer, the distribution and use of household and garden chemicals has been more closely scrutinized. By providing alternatives, their use can be reduced.

History 
Most universities throughout the country, that have agricultural programs, also have university cooperative extensions. These programs include Master Gardeners. The practice of naturescaping is being taught at several of these universities.

Current acceptance 
The practice has spawned many non-profit groups to form near universities teaching this practice. Many include some form of the phrase "naturescaping" in their name. Some states have recognized the benefits to society of this practice and those who either volunteer or create a naturescaped garden. For instance Oregon offers a state tax incentive.

See also 
 Landscape ecology
 Sustainable landscaping

External links 
Oregon Department of Fish and Wildlife (ODFW) promotes Naturescaping
NatureScaping of Southwest Washington
Nature Scaping for Clean Rivers
North Carolina Division of Pollution Prevention and Environmental Assistance

Horticulture
Organic gardening
Landscape architecture
Types of garden